Nelson Rand is a freelance journalist living in Bangkok, Southeast Asia. He is an editor for The Nation newspaper and a regular contributor to the Asia Times. He has also worked as a political contractor for the Embassy of Canada in Thailand.

Career 
Rand has travelled to some of the most remote and little known conflict areas of Southeast Asia.

He published his first book, Conflict: Journeys through war and terror in Southeast Asia  published by Maverick House in 2009. 

The book reviews his time spent with the Hmong, the Karen, the Montagnards of Vietnam and the Muslim rebels in the south of Thailand. Reviewing the obscure histories behind each of these conflicts and the atrocities behind them. The book also focuses on time spent with the Cambodian government troops tracking down the last of the Khmer Rouge in northern Cambodia.

On May 14, 2010, France 24 reported that Nelson Rand had been shot in the leg, hand and abdomen whilst covering the Red-Shirt protests in Bangkok.

References

External links
 Maverick House

Canadian journalists
Living people
Year of birth missing (living people)
Place of birth missing (living people)